is a Japanese manga series written and illustrated by Yumi Unita. It was serialized in Shogakukan's seinen manga magazine Monthly Big Comic Spirits from October 2014 to February 2021.

Publication
Written and illustrated by Yumi Unita, Para Para Days was serialized in Shogakukan's seinen manga magazine Monthly Big Comic Spirits from October 27, 2014, to February 26, 2021. Shogakukan collected its chapters in three tankōbon volumes, released from May 12, 2017, to June 11, 2021.

Volume list

References

External links
 

Romantic comedy anime and manga
Seinen manga
Shogakukan manga